Pitcairnia smithiorum is a plant species in the genus Pitcairnia.

Cultivars 
 Pitcairnia 'Beaujolais'
 Pitcairnia 'Bud Curtis'
 Pitcairnia 'Hattie'
 Pitcairnia 'Jim Scrivner'
 Pitcairnia 'Stephen Hoppin'
 Pitcairnia 'Verdia Lowe'

References 
BSI Cultivar Registry Retrieved 11 October 2009

smithiorum